Revenue Retrievin': Day Shift is the eleventh studio album by American rapper E-40. It was released on March 30, 2010, which was the same day that E-40's Revenue Retrievin': Night Shift was released.

Day Shift features 19 tracks including guest appearances from Too Short, Gucci Mane, B-Legit, Mike Marshall, Suga T, J. Valentine, Droop-E and many others. With this album, E-40 was the first hip-hop artist to release two major studio albums on the same day since Nelly released Sweat and Suit in 2004.

Music videos have been filmed for the songs "Lightweight Jammin'" featuring Clyde Carson and Husalah of Mob Figaz, "Undastandz Me", "The Weedman" featuring Stressmatic, and "It's Gotta Get Betta" featuring Michael Marshall & Suga-T. It sold 74,000 copies in its first week. It has since sold over 352,000 copies.

Track listing

Charts

Weekly charts

Year-end charts

References

2010 albums
E-40 albums
Albums produced by Rick Rock
Albums produced by Droop-E
Jive Records albums